Scheepers is a Dutch and Afrikaans occupational surname meaning "shepherd's" in Middle Dutch. Notable people with the surname include:

Chanelle Scheepers (born 1984), South African tennis player
Gideon Scheepers (1878–1902), South African Boer military leader and scout
Maria Scheepers (1892-1989) Belgian pianist and music educator
Marion Scheepers (born 1957), American mathematician (namesake of the Scheepers Diagram)
Nico Scheepers (born 1990), South African rugby player
Ralf Scheepers (born 1965), German heavy metal singer (namesake of the album Scheepers)
Riana Scheepers (born 1957), South African Afrikaans author
Rozelle Scheepers (born 1974), South African cricketer
 (born 1971), Dutch footballer
Willy Scheepers (born 1961), Dutch footballer

See also
Schepers, Dutch surname
Scheppers, Dutch surname
Scheepers Nek, battle site of the Second Boer War

References

Dutch-language surnames
Afrikaans-language surnames
Occupational surnames